Miss Chinese International Pageant 1995 was held on January 22, 1995 in Hong Kong. The pageant was organized and broadcast by TVB in Hong Kong. Miss Chinese International 1994 Saesim Pornapa Sui crowned Hsiang-Lin Ku of Taipei, Chinese Taipei as the winner.

Pageant information
The theme to this year's pageant is "Worldly Beauty, Gathered in China" (世界艶影  薈萃中華).  The Masters of Ceremonies were Eric Tsang, Emil Chau and Law Ka-Ying.

Results

Special awards
Miss Friendship: Gloria Hui 許家寶 (Vancouver)
Miss Best in Swimsuit: Hsiang-Lin Ku 谷祥鈴 (Taipei)

Crossovers
Contestants who previously competed or will be competing at other international beauty pageants:

Miss World
 1994:  Macau  : Chen Ji-Min

Miss Universe
 1995: : Halina Tam

External links
 Johnny's Pageant Page - Miss Chinese International Pageant 1995

TVB
Miss Chinese International Pageants
1995 beauty pageants
1995 in Hong Kong
Beauty pageants in Hong Kong